Nuria Fernández Domínguez (born 16 August 1976 in Luzern, Switzerland) is a Spanish middle distance runner. She specialises in the 1500 metres and is the Spanish record holder in the mile run and the 1500 m indoors.

Career 
Fernández has represented Spain at the 2000, 2004 and 2012 Summer Olympics as well as at the 1999, 2001, 2003, 2005, 2009 and 2011 World Championships in Athletics. She has also represented Spain at four European Championships in Athletics, three World Athletics Indoor Championships and four European Athletics Indoor Championships.

Fernández's best result came at the 2010 European Championships in Athletics where she won gold in the 1500 m, ahead of France's Hind Dehiba and Spain's Natalia Rodriguez. Following that result, she won silver at the 2011 European Indoor Championships in Athletics held in Paris, behind Russia's  Elena Arzhakova. After a number of athletes were disqualified, Fernandez also won gold at the 2012 European Championships in Athletics held in Helsinki. She also finished fourth in the 1500 m at the 2009 World Championships in Athletics and fourth again in the 3000 m at the 2009 European Athletics Indoor Championships.

Although Fernández specializes in the 1500 m, she has achieved significant success in cross country events. She won bronze medals representing Spain in the team competition at both the 2009 European Cross Country Championships held in Dublin (Ireland) and the 2010 European Cross Country Championships held in Albufeira (Portugal). She followed this with a win at the Cross Internacional de San Sebastián in January 2011, and a victory at the Spanish Cross Country Championships in February 2011.

She ran at the Cursa Bombers 10 km race in 2010 and finished second behind Jéssica Augusto in a time of 33:03. Fernández ran a world-leading and personal best time of 8:38.05 in the 3000 metres at the Gran Premio de Andalucía in Huelva, beating opposition including Ines Chenonge and Sara Moreira.

On 9 December 2010 Fernández was questioned as a witness in relation to Operation Galgo, an investigation into a Spanish athletics doping ring being carried out by the Guardia Civil. She denied all charges of doping and was allowed to remain on the team that represented Spain at the European Cross Country Championships held in Albufeira, Portugal. El País reported that her coach, Manuel Pascua, admitted to police that he organised doping schedules for his athletes.  Pascua later denied this report.

International competitions

Personal bests
800 metres - 2:00.35 min (2008)
1500 metres - 4:00.20 min (2010)
Mile run - 4:21.13 min (2008)
3000 metres - 8:38.05 min (2010)

References

External links
 
 
 
 
 Nuria Fernández: It's never too late, feature article from European Athletics
 Nuria Fernández (fanpage) Nuria Fernández Fan Page.



1976 births
Living people
Spanish female middle-distance runners
Spanish female long-distance runners
Spanish expatriate sportspeople in Switzerland
Athletes (track and field) at the 2000 Summer Olympics
Athletes (track and field) at the 2004 Summer Olympics
Athletes (track and field) at the 2012 Summer Olympics
Olympic athletes of Spain
Sportspeople from Lucerne
European Athletics Championships medalists
Mediterranean Games bronze medalists for Spain
Mediterranean Games medalists in athletics
Athletes (track and field) at the 1997 Mediterranean Games
Athletes (track and field) at the 2005 Mediterranean Games